Arena Vestjylland Forsikring (West Jutland Insurance), or Lemvig Idræts- & Kulturcenter, is an indoor sports arena in Lemvig, Denmark. It has a capacity of 1,400 spectators and is the home court of the handball team, Lemvig-Thyborøn Håndbold and the basketball club Lemvig Basket.

The arena contains a handball court, six badminton courts, three volleyball courts and a basketball court.

References 
 About the arena 

Handball venues in Denmark
Indoor arenas in Denmark
Lemvig Municipality
Buildings and structures in the Central Denmark Region
Lemvig